Keith Seaman is an American politician and a retired public-school teacher. He is a Democratic member of the Arizona House of Representatives elected to represent District 16 in 2022. He defeated Republican candidate Rob Hudelson by a margin of 644 votes, or 0.62%.

He worked in education for four decades including as a teacher, principal, and the superintendent of Mohave County, Arizona.

References

External links 

 Biography at Ballotpedia

Democratic Party members of the Arizona House of Representatives
Living people
Year of birth missing (living people)
21st-century American politicians
20th-century American educators
21st-century American educators
School superintendents in Arizona
People from Mohave County, Arizona